William Radcliffe (1761?, in Mellor, Derbyshire – 20 May 1842, in Stockport) was a British inventor and author of the essay Origin of the New System of Manufacture, Commonly Called Power loom Weaving.

Biography
Radcliffe came from a modest family which had made the transition from farming to weaving. His father taught him about carding and spinning. In 1785, he purchased several spinning machines that had been developed by James Hargreaves. Hargreaves machines, called the spinning jenny, were the first wholly successful improvement on the traditional spinning wheel. Its advantage was to multiply many times the amount of yarn that could be spun by a single operator. This development and others such as weavers being able to rely on uninterrupted supplies of yarn led to spinning being concentrated in factories.

Powerloom weaving
In 1789, Radcliffe opened a large cotton weaving factory at Mellor, in Derbyshire. He streamlined the process by inventing a machine to improve the quality of cloth. In 1804 he invented a ratchet wheel that moved the cloth forward automatically. Radcliffe also contributed to the debate amongst entrepreneurs on what constituted profits in a capitalist system. In a letter dated 1 May 1804, which was never sent but later published in an 1811 book called Letters on the Evils of the Exportation of Cotton Yarns, Radcliffe said he regarded profit as being made up of two parts: interest on money and a sort of entrepreneurial wage.

In 1828, he wrote the essay Origin of the New System of Manufacture, Commonly Called Power loom Weaving, later reprinted in J. F. C. Harrison's Society and Politics in England, 1780-1960 (New York: Harper & Row, 1965).

See also
Industrial Revolution
Weaving
Spinning jenny

References
Notes

Bibliography
Capital and the Cotton Industry in the Industrial Revolution, by Seymour Shapiro, 1967, Cornell University, printed in the U.S. by Kingsport Press.
The Industrial Revolution in Britain: Triumph or Disaster? By Philip A. M. Taylor, 1958, in the U.S. by D.C. Heath and Company.
The First Industrial Revolution, edited by Peter Mathias and John A. Davis, 1989, in Great Britain by Basil Blackwell Ltd.
The First Industrial Revolution, by Phyllis Deane, The First Industrial Revolution, 1965 in Great Britain, by the Cambridge University Press.
The Industrial Revolution by Arnold Toynbee, 1956, in the U.S. by The Beacon Press
British Economic Growth during the Industrial Revolution by N.F.R. Crafts, 1985, in Great Britain by Oxford University Press.

External links
William Radcliffe on Spartacus Educational
 Portrait of William Radcliffe

Weaving families
People of the Industrial Revolution
Textile workers
English inventors
1761 births
1842 deaths
People from Mellor, Greater Manchester